Joseph Jean-Pierre Marc Garneau  (born February 23, 1949) is a Canadian retired politician, retired Royal Canadian Navy officer and former astronaut who served as a Cabinet minister from 2015 to 2021. A member of the Liberal Party, Garneau was the minister of foreign affairs from January to October 2021 and minister of transport from November 2015 to January 2021. He is the Member of Parliament (MP) for Notre-Dame-de-Grâce—Westmount.

Prior to entering politics, Garneau served as a naval officer and was selected as an astronaut, part of the 1983 NRC Group. On October 5, 1984, he became the first Canadian in outer space as part of STS-41-G and served on two subsequent Space Shuttle missions—STS-77 and STS-97.

Early life
Joseph Jean-Pierre Marc Garneau was born on February 23, 1949, in Quebec City, Quebec, Canada. He attended primary and secondary schools in Quebec City and Saint-Jean-sur-Richelieu. He also has a brother, Philippe Garneau.

Education and military career
Garneau graduated from the Royal Military College of Canada in 1970 with a bachelor of science in engineering physics and began his career in the Canadian Forces Maritime Command.

In 1973 he received a PhD in electrical engineering from the Imperial College of Science and Technology in London, England. His thesis was entitled "The Perception of Facial Images". The Photofit analogue computer was used by him to discriminate facial features.

In 1974, Garneau served as a naval combat systems engineer aboard .

From 1982 to 1983, he attended the Canadian Forces Command and Staff College in Toronto. While there, he was promoted to the rank of commander and was transferred to Ottawa in 1983. In January 1986, he was promoted to captain(N). Garneau retired from the Canadian Forces in 1989.

Space career
Garneau was one of six first Canadian Astronauts and he became the first Canadian in outer space on October 5, 1984. In 1984, he was seconded to the new Canadian Astronaut Program (CAP), one of six chosen from over 4,000 applicants; of these six he was the only military officer.

Garneau flew on the Space Shuttle Challenger, STS-41-G from October 5 to 13, 1984, as payload specialist. He was promoted to captain(N) in 1986, and left the Canadian Forces in 1989, to become deputy director of the CAP. In 1992–93, he underwent further training to become a mission specialist. He worked as CAPCOM for a number of shuttle flights and was on two further flights himself: STS-77 (May 19 to 29, 1996) and STS-97 (to the ISS, November 30 to December 11, 2000). He has logged over 677 hours in space.

In February 2001, Garneau was appointed executive vice-president of the Canadian Space Agency, and became its president on November 22, 2001.

Political career
Garneau has served as the member of Parliament (MP) for the Montreal riding of Notre-Dame-de-Grâce—Westmount, and its predecessor Westmount—Ville-Marie since the 2008 federal election, winning by over 9,000 votes. He was re-elected to the House of Commons in the 2011 federal election by 642 votes, and in the 2015 federal election with a majority of over 18,000. Previously, he unsuccessfully stood in the riding of Vaudreuil-Soulanges at the 2006 federal election.

On November 28, 2012, Garneau announced his candidacy for the leadership of the Liberal Party to be decided in April 2013. On March 13, 2013, Garneau formally withdrew his bid for the party leadership. On November 4, 2015, Garneau was appointed as Minister of Transport in the 29th Canadian Ministry. He became Minister of Foreign Affairs on January 12, 2021 after a cabinet reshuffle.

Initial candidacy 
Garneau resigned as the president of the Canadian Space Agency to run for the Liberal Party of Canada in the 2006 federal election in the riding of Vaudreuil—Soulanges, which was then held by Meili Faille of the Bloc Québécois. The Liberal Party's support dropped off considerably in Quebec after the Sponsorship scandal and though considered a star candidate, Garneau lost to Faille by over nine-thousand votes.

In the 2006 Liberal Party leadership election Garneau announced his support for perceived front-runner Michael Ignatieff, who lost to Stéphane Dion on the final ballot. With the resignation of Liberal MP Jean Lapierre in 2007, Garneau expressed interest in being the party's candidate in Lapierre's former riding of Outremont. Dion instead appointed Jocelyn Coulon as the party's candidate, who went on to be defeated by the New Democratic Party's Thomas Mulcair in the by-election.

In May 2007, Garneau filed nomination papers to be the party's candidate in Westmount—Ville-Marie, after former Liberal Party deputy leader Lucienne Robillard announced she would not be seeking re-election. However, a week after filing his nomination papers Dion announced that he had hand-picked a candidate for the riding. Garneau later withdrew his nomination papers and announced he no longer had an interest in politics. In October 2007, Garneau and Dion held a joint news conference where they announced that Garneau would be the Liberal Party candidate in Westmount—Ville-Marie. Robillard announced her resignation as Member of Parliament in January and a by-election was later scheduled for September 8, 2008. However, the by-election was cancelled during the campaign when Prime Minister Stephen Harper called a general election for October 14, 2008. Though some pundits predicted a close race between Garneau and NDP candidate Anne Lagacé-Dowson, Garneau went on to win the riding by over 9,000 votes.

41st Parliament and leadership campaign

Garneau was narrowly re-elected in the 2011 election where he beat New Democratic Party candidate Joanne Corbeil. He was Liberal House leader and served as Liberal foreign affairs critic. He was a candidate for interim leadership of the Liberal Party, but was ultimately defeated by Bob Rae. Garneau announced later that year that he was considering a bid for the permanent leadership of the party. In the summer of 2012, he announced that he was looking for a "dream team" to run his leadership bid and that he would only run if he could find the right people.

On November 21, 2012, Garneau was named his party's natural resources critic after David McGuinty resigned the post.

On November 28, 2012, Garneau announced his bid for the leadership of the Liberal Party, placing a heavy focus on the economy. While fellow leadership candidate Justin Trudeau was widely seen as the front-runner in the race, Garneau was thought to be his main challenger among the candidates. With his entrance into the leadership race he resigned his post as Liberal House leader, while remaining the party's critic for natural resources.

At the press conference announcing his candidacy Garneau ruled out any form of co-operation with the Green Party or New Democratic Party to help defeat the Conservative Party in the next election, which was proposed by leadership candidate Joyce Murray.

On January 30, 2013, Garneau was replaced as natural resources critic by Ted Hsu. Garneau had been serving in the position on an interim basis.On March 13, 2013 Garneau announced his withdrawal from the race, and threw his support to front-runner Justin Trudeau. On September 18, 2013, Garneau was named co-chair of the Liberal International Affairs Council of Advisors, providing advice on foreign and defence issues to Liberal Party of Canada leader Justin Trudeau.

Minister of Transport 
In the 2015 elections held on October 19, 2015, Garneau was re-elected as MP in the newly created riding of Notre-Dame-de-Grâce—Westmount. Two weeks later, on November 4, 2015, Garneau was appointed the minister of transport by Prime Minister Justin Trudeau.

In May 2017, Garneau introduced an airline passenger bill of rights to standardize how passengers can be treated by airlines which operate any flights in and out of Canada. The legislation would create minimum compensation rates for overbooking, lost or damaged luggage, and bumping passengers off flights. It would also prohibit airlines from removing people from the flight if they have purchased a ticket and set the standard for tarmac delays and airline treatment of passengers when flights are delayed or cancelled over events in the airline's control, or because of weather conditions.

In March 2019, after days of initial refusal to take actions following the crash of Ethiopian Airlines Flight 302, Garneau finally agreed to ground and prohibit all Boeing 737 Max aircraft from flying in Canadian airspace. This stood in contrast to the ministry's previous stance, where he insisted the plane was safe to fly, thus making Canada one of the only two nations still flying a substantial number of Boeing 737 Max planes at the time. Garneau even went so far as saying he would board 737 MAX 8 "without hesitation", as an apparent show of support for the Boeing Company.

Minister of Foreign Affairs 
On January 12, 2021, following the resignation of Navdeep Bains as minister of innovation, science and industry, Prime Minister Justin Trudeau shuffled the Cabinet, with Garneau becoming Minister of Foreign Affairs. Garneau was described as one of the most qualified and capable members of Cabinet.

Following the cabinet reshuffle stemming from the election in October 2021, Garneau was dropped from Cabinet on October 26, despite being re-elected to his seat in the House. Some have speculated that Garneau did not remain in cabinet due to his age, being sacrificed in the name of gender parity, and that he reportedly refused to be subservient to the Prime Minister’s Office.

Retirement 
On March 8, 2023, Garneau announced that he will resign his seat and retire from politics. He gave his farewell speech in the House of Commons the same day.

Awards and honours

107px

100px

Garneau was appointed an Officer of the Order of Canada in 1984 in recognition of his role as the first Canadian astronaut.  He was promoted the rank of Companion within the order in 2003 for his extensive work with Canada's space program.

He was awarded the Canadian Forces Decoration for 12 years of honourable service with the Canadian Forces.

He is honoured with a high school named after him, Marc Garneau Collegiate Institute in Toronto  and É.S.P. Marc-Garneau in Trenton, Ontario.

Garneau is the Honorary Captain of the Royal Canadian Sea Cadets. In addition, no 599 Royal Canadian Air Cadets squadron is named in his honour.

Garneau was awarded the Key to the City of Ottawa from Marion Dewar the Mayor of Ottawa on December 10, 1984.

He was inducted into the International Space Hall of Fame in 1992.

Honorary degrees

Electoral record

See also
Astronaut-politician
List of Canadian university leaders

References

External links

 Official website
 Bio and mandate from the Prime Minister 

 Canadian Space Agency biography
 NASA biography
 Spacefacts biography of Marc Garneau
 CBC Digital Archives – Marc Garneau: Canadian Space Pioneer

 Marc Garneau

 
 

|-

|-

|-

1949 births
Alumni of Imperial College London
Astronaut-politicians
Canadian astronauts
Canadian Roman Catholics
Canadian Ministers of Transport
Chancellors of Carleton University
Companions of the Order of Canada
French Quebecers
Liberal Party of Canada MPs
Living people
Members of the 29th Canadian Ministry
Members of the House of Commons of Canada from Quebec
Members of the King's Privy Council for Canada
People from Westmount, Quebec
Politicians from Quebec City
Presidents of the Canadian Space Agency
Royal Canadian Navy officers
Royal Military College of Canada alumni
Royal Military College Saint-Jean people
Systems engineers
Space Shuttle program astronauts
Canadian Ministers of Foreign Affairs